Brave Heart is the third studio album by Kim Hill, released in 1991. It earned a Grammy nomination for Best Rock/Contemporary Gospel Album. It reached number 11 on the Contemporary Christian Albums chart in Billboard Magazine.

Track listing

"Words" (Kim Hill, Gordon Kennedy, Wayne Kirkpatrick) – 3:25 
"Satisfied" (Kirkpatrick) – 4:47 
"Up in the Sky" (Kennedy, Kirkpatrick) – 2:40
"Mysterious Ways" (Kirkpatrick) – 5:37 
"Round and Round" (Hill, Kirkpatrick) – 3:37
"Stop My Heart" (Hill, Kirkpatrick, Chris McHugh, Tommy Sims) – 6:10 
"She'll Come Around" (Kennedy, Kirkpatrick) – 3:37 
"Don't Face the World Alone" (Karen Peris) – 4:15 
"In My Life" (Hill, Kirkpatrick, Sims, Bob Farrell) – 4:55 
"I Will Wait" (Hill, Kirkpatrick, Sims) – 2:36

Personnel 
 Kim Hill – lead vocals 
 Carl Marsh – Fairlight strings (1, 3, 6), Fairlight brass (1), keyboards (8)
 Blair Masters – keyboards (1, 6), E-mu Emulator III (1–9), Fender Rhodes (4), arrangements (5)
 Phil Madeira – Hammond B3 organ (1, 3, 4, 5, 10)
 Wayne Kirkpatrick – acoustic guitar (1–5, 7, 9, 10), backing vocals (1, 4, 6, 7, 8), arrangements (5), hi-string guitar (6, 10)
 Gordon Kennedy – acoustic guitar (1, 6, 7), electric guitar (1–9), talk box (1), hi-string guitar (3, 8, 9, 10), dobro (7), double-neck guitar (7), slide guitar solo (7)
 Jerry McPherson – electric guitar (2, 4, 5, 7, 8), hi-string guitar (3), 12-string electric guitar (5), arrangements (5), acoustic guitar (10)
 Tommy Sims – bass (1–9), arrangements (5), acoustic guitar (9, 10)
 Chris McHugh – drums (1–9), arrangements (5)
 Terry McMillan – percussion (4), tambourine (5), shaker (7, 9), sleigh bells (8)
 John Hammond – drum programming (7)
 Wes King – arrangements (5)
 Chris Harris – backing vocals (1, 2, 4, 6, 7, 8)
 Mark Heimmerman – backing vocals (1, 2, 6, 7)
 Lisa Bevill – backing vocals (2)
 Chris Rodriguez – backing vocals (8)

Production
 Brown Bannister – producer, overdub engineer
 Wayne Kirkpatrick – producer 
 Richard Headen – executive producer 
 Jeff Balding – recording, mixing 
 Steve Bishir – recording assistant, overdub engineer
 Bill Whittington – overdub engineer
 Quad Studios, Nashville, Tennessee – recording location
 Home Groan Studio, Nashville, Tennessee – overdub recording location
 OmniSound Studios, Nashville, Tennessee – mixing location 
 Patrick Kelly – mix assistant
 Doug Sax – mastering at The Mastering Lab, Hollywood, California
 Traci Sterling – production coordinator
 Buddy Jackson – art direction
 D.L. Rhodes – art direction
 Beth Middleworth – design
 Mark Tucker – photography

References

1991 albums
Kim Hill (singer) albums